Melendez Films (formerly Bill Melendez Productions and Melendez Features, Inc.) is a film animation studio. It was founded in 1962 by Steven C. Melendez, the son of Peanuts animator Bill Melendez. 

The studio produced the ambitious animated feature film Dick Deadeye, based on the operettas of Gilbert and Sullivan. In 1979 the company produced a one-and-a-half-hour television special based on the C.S. Lewis classic book The Lion, the Witch and the Wardrobe, and the film subsequently won two Emmy Awards for "best animated film" and "script adaptation". Melendez Films has also produced many series for television including "Fred Basset" and "The Perishers", as well as educational mini films like Molly and the Skywalkerz for PBS, which were not rebroadcast for a couple of decades and did not surface on home media until after the 1998 VHS debut.

The company continues to create commercials in France, Italy, Spain, the Netherlands, Germany, Greece and Sweden as well as the UK and the U.S. working for clients such as Scandinavian Airlines, Schick, British Rail, Colgate, Ferrero, and the British Government.

Mendelson/Melendez Productions  

Mendelson/Melendez Productions (sometimes credited as Mendelson-Melendez Productions  and formerly as Lee Mendelson/Bill Melendez Productions.) was an American animation studio founded in 1965 and was active until 2006. It was mostly famous for its Peanuts animated specials.

References

See also
Peanuts filmography
Lee Mendelson Film Productions

Mass media companies established in 1962
British animation studios
1962 establishments in England